Turquoise is a gemstone.

Turquoise may also refer to:

Arts 
 Turquoise (album), a 2013 album by Devon Allman
 Turquoise (Dr. Stone), a character in the manga series Dr. Stone
 Turquoise (film), 2009
 The Turquoise (novel), a 1946 novel by Anya Seton
 "Turquoise" (song), a 1965 song by Donovan

Other uses 
 Turquoise (color)
 Turquoise (horse), a British Thoroughbred racehorse
 Turquoise (trading platform), a European equities trading platform
 Turquoise ribbon
 French ship Turquoise, several ships
 Turquoise Trail, a National Scenic Byway in the United States

See also 
 Turquoise Coast (disambiguation)